Friedemann is a German given name meaning "peace man".
 Wilhelm Friedemann Bach, German composer and eldest son of Johann Sebastian Bach
 Friedemann Friese, a German board game designer
 Friedemann Schulz von Thun

Friedemann (surname)
 Nancy Friedemann-Sánchez, a Colombian–American visual artist based in Lincoln, Nebraska.

See also 
 Friedman

German masculine given names
German-language surnames
Surnames